Tub Springs State Wayside is a state park in the U.S. state of Oregon, administered by the Oregon Parks and Recreation Department.

See also
 List of Oregon state parks

References

External links
 

State parks of Oregon
Parks in Jackson County, Oregon